Denis is a midprice compilation album of recordings by the band Blondie first released by Disky Records in the Netherlands in 1996. It includes a number of singles, album tracks, b-sides and a demo of "Platinum Blonde" which previously appeared on the 1994 compilation album The Platinum Collection.

The compilation has since been re-released in UK and Europe by EMI under the title The Essential Collection in 1997 and then again in 1999.

The compilation is notable for including at least one song from every Blondie album at that point, but omitting the band's biggest hits such as "Heart of Glass", "Call Me", and "Rapture".

Track listing

References

Denis
Denis
Denis